The Frank W. Thomas House is a historic house located at 210 Forest Avenue in the Chicago suburb of Oak Park, Illinois, United States. The building was designed by architect Frank Lloyd Wright in 1901 and cast in the Wright-developed Prairie School of Architecture. By Wright's own definition, this was the first of the Prairie houses - the rooms are elevated, and there is no basement. The house also includes many of the features which became associated with the style, such as a low roof with broad overhangs, casement windows, built-in shelves and cabinets, ornate leaded glass windows and central hearths/fireplaces. Tallmadge & Watson, a Chicago firm that became part of the Prairie School of Architects, added an addition to the rear of the house in 1923.

On September 14, 1972, the Frank Thomas House was added to the U.S. National Register of Historic Places.

References
Heinz, Thomas A. The Vision of Frank Lloyd Wright, S. Webb & Sons., Isle of Anglesey, UK: 2002, pp. 81–85, .
 Storrer, William Allin. The Frank Lloyd Wright Companion. University Of Chicago Press, 2006,  (S.067).

Notes

Frank Lloyd Wright buildings
Houses completed in 1901
Houses on the National Register of Historic Places in Cook County, Illinois
Oak Park, Illinois